is a former Japanese football player.

Playing career
Shuhei Shirai played for Sagawa Printing and YSCC Yokohama from 2008 to 2015.

References

External links

1985 births
Living people
Ritsumeikan University alumni
Association football people from Kanagawa Prefecture
Japanese footballers
J3 League players
Japan Football League players
SP Kyoto FC players
YSCC Yokohama players
Association football defenders